Pat Hayes (born February 13, 1951) is an American rower. He competed in the men's coxed four event at the 1976 Summer Olympics.

References

1951 births
Living people
American male rowers
Olympic rowers of the United States
Rowers at the 1976 Summer Olympics
Sportspeople from Salinas, California
Pan American Games medalists in rowing
Pan American Games gold medalists for the United States
Rowers at the 1975 Pan American Games